The Paraguayan U-20 women's national football team is the national under-20 women's association football team of Paraguay. They are controlled by the Asociación Paraguaya de Fútbol. They finished 2nd in their debut at the South American Under-20 Women's Football Championship.

Records

U-20 Women's World Cup record

South American U-20 Women's Championship record

See also
 Paraguay women's national football team (Senior)
 Paraguay women's national under-17 football team
 Paraguay men's national under-20 football team
 Football in Paraguay

External links
 Paraguayan Football Association Website

u-20
South American women's national under-20 association football teams